The Climate Change Committee (CCC), originally named the Committee on Climate Change, is an independent non-departmental public body, formed under the Climate Change Act (2008) to advise the United Kingdom and devolved Governments and Parliaments on tackling and preparing for climate change. The Committee provides advice on setting carbon budgets (for the UK Government carbon budgets are designed to place a limit or ceiling on the level of economy-wide emissions that can be emitted in a five-year period), and reports regularly to the Parliaments and Assemblies on the progress made in reducing greenhouse gas emissions. Notably, in 2019 the CCC recommended the adoption of a target of net zero greenhouse gas emissions by the United Kingdom by 2050. On 27 June 2019 the British Parliament amended the Climate Change Act (2008) to include a commitment to net zero emissions by 2050. The CCC also advises and comments on the UK's progress on Climate change adaptation through updates to Parliament.

History
The Committee on Climate Change was formally launched as a statutory committee in December 2008 with Lord Turner as its chair.

An Adaptation Sub-Committee was set up in 2009 to provide advice to Government about adaptation, meaning the steps the government and devolved administrations of the United Kingdom should be taking to prepare for climate change impacts.

On 1 December 2008 the committee published its first major report entitled "Building a low-carbon economy – the UK’s contribution to tackling climate change". This recommended that the UK adopt a long-term target to reduce emissions of all greenhouse gases by at least 80% by 2050, in order to tackle climate change. It recommended the level of three five-yearly carbon budgets to cover the periods 2008–2012, 2013-2017 and 2018–2022.

In line with the recommendations in the committee's report, in April 2009 the Government set a requirement for a 34% cut in carbon emissions by 2020.

In December 2010 the Committee recommended a 4th Carbon Budget to cover the period from 2023 to 2027. They recommended that the Government aims to cut emissions by at least 60% by 2030 to ensure that the UK is on track to meet the 2050 target, with Parliament to debate the contents and proposals of this report before the summer's recess. A recommendation on the 5th Carbon Budget was published in November 2015 and adopted by the UK Government on 30 June 2016.

In addition to reports to advise on the level of carbon budgets, the CCC also provides annual progress reports to Parliament which provide an update on Government's progress towards meeting climate targets. The CCC has published Progress Reports for 2009, 2010, and every year since. The first biennial joint progress report from the Committee on Climate Change and the Adaptation Sub-Committee was presented to the UK Parliament on 30 June 2015. The joint progress reports include an assessment of the UK Government's National Adaptation Programme by the Adaptation Sub-Committee.

The committee also publishes other advice on climate change science, economics and policy. It has recently published advice to Government about the Carbon Reduction Commitment, Low-carbon innovation, Aviation, Adaptation and Scottish climate change targets.

The Adaptation Sub-Committee published in July 2016 the Evidence Report to inform the UK Government's second UK Climate Change Risk Assessment due to be presented to Parliament in January 2017.

On 15 October 2018, Energy and Climate Change Minister Claire Perry formally wrote to the CCC requesting advice on a date for achieving net zero greenhouse gas emissions across the economy. This came seven days after the publication of a special report by the Intergovernmental Panel on Climate Change (IPCC) on the impact of global warming of 1.5 °C above pre-industrial levels. The CCC published its advice on 2 May 2019.

In December 2020, the CCC published its advice for the sixth Carbon Budget (2033 to 2037). The sixth carbon budget is the first to be advised on since Parliament legislated for a target of Net Zero carbon emissions by 2050 in 2019. The recommended pathway is consistent with the Net Zero target and requires a 78% reduction in UK territorial emissions between 1990 and 2035. In effect, this brings forward the UK's previous 80% target by nearly 15 years. The Government formally accepted the recommendation from the CCC (965Mt of Carbon dioxide equivalent in the budgetary period 2033 to 2037) in April 2021, and Parliament passed the relevant statutory instrument in June 2021.

Separately in December 2020, following a request for advice from the Secretary of State for Business, Energy and Industrial Strategy Alok Sharma, the CCC recommended that the government adopt a commitment to reduce UK territorial carbon emissions by at least 68% from 1990 to 2030, as part of the UK's nationally determined contribution (NDC) to the UN process as specified in the Paris Agreement. Under the Paris agreement signatory countries have discretion to set their own NDCs, and some environmental activist groups had previously called for a UK NDC of a 75% reduction, whilst Professor Lord Nicholas Stern (speaking in an academic capacity as chair of the Grantham Institute at the London School of Economics) had suggested 70%. The Prime Minister Boris Johnson made the 69% commitment the same day as the CCC published its recommendation (3 December) and stated "We have proven we can reduce our emissions and create hundreds of thousands of jobs in the process. We are taking the lead with an ambitious new target to reduce our emissions by 2030, faster than any major economy … The UK is urging world leaders to bring forward their own ambitious plans to cut emissions and set net zero [carbon] targets."

In December 2020, the Committee adopted a new brand design developed by the branding and digital agency TEMPLO. This includes a new logo, a new visual style to its reports and website, and renaming as the Climate Change Committee.

Members of the Committee

Members 
, the chair is John Gummer, Lord Deben, and the other committee members are Baroness Brown, Professor Nick Chater, Dr Rebecca Heaton, Professor Piers Forster, Paul Johnson, Professor Corinne Le Quéré and Professor James Skea.

Baroness Brown is the Chair of the Adaptation Sub-Committee. The other Sub-Committee members are Professor Richard Dawson, Professor Dame Georgina Mace, Ece Ozdemiroglu, Rosalyn Schofield and Professor Michael Davies.

As of April 2018, the Chief Executive of the committee is Chris Stark.

Former members 
The first chairman of the committee was Lord Turner (2008–12). Other previous Committee members include Professor Michael Grubb (2008-2011), Lord Krebs (2009-2017), Lord May (2008-2016), and Professor Sam Fankhauser (2008-2016). David Kennedy was Chief Executive of the committee from 2008 until May 2014.

Former members of the Adaptation Sub-Committee include Professor Martin Parry (2009-2017), Professor Sam Fankhauser (2009-2017), Sir Graham Wynne (2009-2018), Dame Anne Johnson (2009-2018) and Professor Jim Hall (2009-2019)

Reports and key recommendations

Carbon budget reports
 "Building a low-carbon economy - the UK's contribution to tackling climate change - 1st December 2008"
Key recommendations:
1. The UK should reduce emissions of all Greenhouse gases by 80% by 2050
2. The first three carbon budgets (2008-2012, 2013-2017 and 2018–2022) should lead to emission reductions of 34% by 2020
3. The budgets should cover all sectors of the economy and can be achieved at a cost of 1-2% of GDP in 2050
 The Fourth Carbon Budget - Reducing emissions through the 2020s - 7 December 2010
Key recommendations:
1. Review of the latest climate science reveals that the case for action is robust
2. The fourth carbon budget should limit emissions to 1,950 MTCO2e for period 2023–2027, leading to a 60% emissions cut by 2030
3. Electricity Market Reform is urgently required, alongside appropriate policies in buildings, agriculture, transport and industry sectors
 The Fifth Carbon Budget - June 2013
The fifth statutory report to Parliament on progress towards meeting carbon budgets was published in June 2013. Implementing of  loft and cavity wall insulation, boiler replacement, new car efficiency, investment in renewable power generation, and waste emissions reduction was stated to be in good progress.

 The Sixth Carbon Budget The UK’s path to Net Zero - December 2020

The Sixth Carbon Budget report is based on an extensive programme of analysis, consultation and consideration by the committee and its staff, building on the evidence published in 2019 on Net Zero advice. The publication also includes a report detailing the road to 'Net Zero finance' and a report by Cambridge Econometrics on the potential macroeconomic effect of the Sixth Carbon Budget and Net Zero. The macroeconomic analysis is based on a Post-Keynesian model, and suggests that UK gross domestic product will be 2-3% higher in 2050 under the pathway relative to a baseline of the continuation of existing policies.

Progress reports
 "Meeting Carbon Budgets - the need for a step change" - 12 October 2009"
Key recommendations: 
1. A step change is required in the rate of emission reductions, moving from annual cuts of 0.5% to 2-3% each year
2. Rapid decarbonisation of the power sector is a priority, alongside energy efficiency improvements and reductions in road transport emissions
3. Achieving the carbon budgets is possible at low cost
 "Meeting carbon budgets - ensuring a low-carbon recovery - 30 June 2010"
Key recommendations:
1. A step change is still required
2. GHG have reduced in 2009 but this is largely due to the recession and is not as the result of underlying progress
3. New policies are required in 4 areas: electricity market reform, energy efficiency, electric cars and agriculture

Other advisory reports
 "UK Aviation Report - 8 December 2009"
Key recommendations:
1. Any future airport expansion should stay within a limit of increasing passenger demand by 60% by 2050
2. There is scope to reduce emissions through improving fuel efficiency and aircraft design and through operational improvements
3. Aviation emissions must be included within a UK strategy to tackle climate change
 "Scotland's path to a low-carbon economy - 24 February 2010"
Key recommendations:
1. Scotland's interim target to reduce emissions by 42% by 2020 is ambitious, but achievable
2. Flexibility should be added to system of using annual targets to reduce risk
3. The Scottish Government should set out a strategy to deliver budgets through strengthening key policies
 "Building a low-carbon economy - the UK's innovation challenge - 19 July 2010"
Key recommendations:
1. Funding for a suite of low-carbon technologies required to meet 2050 target should be protected
2. Any reduction in current funding levels (£550m per year) would increase the risk of missing carbon budgets
3. UK should focus on developing and deploying offshore wind, marine (wave and tidal), Carbon capture and storage, smart grids and meters, electric vehicles and aviation.
 "How well prepared is the UK for climate change? - 16 September 2010"
Key recommendations:
1. The impacts of climate change are already being felt in the UK
2. The UK should act now to start to prepare itself for a warmer climate
3. 5 Key priority areas for action are: buildings, land-use planning, emergency planning, infrastructure and natural resources
 "The CRC Energy Efficiency Scheme - advice to Government on the second phase - 24 September 2010"
Key recommendations:
1. The scheme should be redesigned to reduce its complexity before the start of the 2nd phase
2. Separate league tables should be established for the private and public sectors
3. The sale of an unlimited number of allowances at a fixed price should be used, rather than a complex auctioning system

In 2011, it planned to publish a Renewable Energy Review (May 2011), a 3rd Progress Report to Parliament (June 2011), 2nd report on Adaptation (July 2011) and a Review of Bioenergy (November 2011).

Quotes about the CCC
After accepting the CCC's proposals on the 4th Carbon Budget, Chris Huhne, Secretary of State for Energy and Climate Change said:

"The Coalition Government has set a fourth carbon budget level, in line with the advice from the Committee on Climate Change, that sends a clear signal about our determination to transform Britain permanently into a low carbon economy. By cutting emissions we’re also getting ourselves off the oil hook, making our energy supplies more secure and opening up opportunities for jobs in the new green industries of the future."

On the committee's first Progress Report, Professor Lord Nicholas Stern said:
"The Committee on Climate Change has produced a report which charts both the way forward in monitoring targets, emissions and policies and shows what will be required to achieve the necessary emissions reductions; it is a fine piece of work, which should be supported across the political spectrum and which will enhance the UK's role in fostering global understanding and agreement."

Criticism
The CCC has been criticised by George Monbiot for what he says is its target culture, and for emphasizing planting trees commercially for bio-energy with carbon capture and storage instead of letting them regrow naturally as part of rewilding,

See also

Energy policy of the United Kingdom
Energy use and conservation in the United Kingdom
Department of Energy and Climate Change

References

External links and further reading
 Committee on Climate Change website
 Read the CCC's reports
 Latest news about the Committee
 CCC Blog
 Find out more about the CCC
 Contact information
 "COLUMN-UK climate act limits energy choices: Gerard Wynn"

Climate change policy
Climate change in the United Kingdom
Department of Energy and Climate Change
Non-departmental public bodies of the United Kingdom government
Climate Change Committee